Melica parodiana is a species of grass found in Buenos Aires, Argentina and Uruguay.

Description
The species is perennial and caespitose with short rhizomes. The plant stem is scabrous and glabrous. The leaf-sheaths are pubescent, tubular, and are closed on one end. The axis of the panicle is dominant while the main panicle branches are appressed and smooth.

The pedicels are curved, filiform, pubescent, and hairy above. Besides being pediceled they also have 1-2 fertile florets which are diminished at the apex. The species' rhachilla is scaberulous while callus is pubescent. Both the upper and lower glumes are keelless and membranous.

The species' lemma have ciliated and hairy margins with obtuse apex. Its palea have ciliolated keels and emarginated apex. The fruits have caryopsis with additional pericarp and linear hilum.

Ecology
It is found in cracks of the rocky slopes. Its flowering time is from late October to early November.

References

parodiana
Flora of South America